Phyllophora pseudoceranoides, the stalked leaf bearer, is a small marine red alga.

Description
The frond is generally flattened and fan shaped, growing from a discoid holdfast forming a terete stipe with flattened branches dividing dichotomously as a blade with rounded apices. The medulla, the inner parts of the frond, is composed of large thick walled cells, closely packed become smaller towards the cortex.

Reproduction
The plants are usually dioecious, male and female parts on separate plants. The spermatangia pits in the cortex, the cystocarps are pedicellate, urn-shaped growing to 3 mm long. The tetrasporangia occur form patches in rows on the sides of the blade.

Habitat
In rock pools and in the intertidal zone to a depth of 30 m.

Distribution
Commonly to be found around the Great Britain, Ireland, Isle of Man, Channel Islands, Iceland, Norway to Portugal and the Mediterranean.

References

Phyllophoraceae